John Wilson-Patten, 1st Baron Winmarleigh PC (26 April 1802 – 11 July 1892) was a British Conservative politician.

Background and education
Winmarleigh was the second son of Thomas Wilson (formerly Patten) of Warrington, Lancashire, and Elizabeth Hyde, daughter of Nathan Hyde of Ardwick. His father had in 1800 assumed the surname of Wilson in lieu of Patten in accordance with the will of Thomas Wilson (his first cousin twice removed), son of Thomas Wilson, Bishop of Sodor and Man from 1697 to 1755, to whose estates Patten succeeded. However, a few years later the family assumed the surname of Wilson-Patten. He was educated at Eton and Magdalen College, Oxford. While at Oxford, he became friendly with, amongst others, Edward Stanley, later 14th Earl of Derby. He was the president of the Oxford Union.

He was appointed Colonel of the part-time 3rd Royal Lancashire Militia (The Duke of Lancaster's Own) on 15 November 1842. During the Crimean War the regiment was embodied for full-time duty in April 1855 and volunteered for overseas service. Wilson-Patten accompanied his regiment when it sailed from Liverpool to Gibraltar and commanded it during a year's garrison duty there, despite his political duties. He was appointed Honorary Colonel of the regiment on 27 February 1872 after his retirement from command.

He built Winmarleigh Hall in 1871.

Political career
In 1830 Winmarleigh was elected Member of Parliament for Lancashire, but stood down the following year. However, in 1832 he returned to Parliament as representative for the newly created constituency of North Lancashire, a seat he would hold for the next 42 years. In the House of Commons he became known as a supporter of industrial and labour reform, and took an active part in helping to relieve the Lancashire cotton famine of 1861 to 1865. However, Wilson-Patten did not hold ministerial office until 1867, when, aged 65, he was appointed Chancellor of the Duchy of Lancaster in the last administration of his old friend the Earl of Derby. He was admitted to the Privy Council the same year. He remained in this post until the following year, and then served briefly under Benjamin Disraeli as Chief Secretary for Ireland from September to December 1868. The latter year he also became a member of the Irish Privy Council.

In 1874, on his retirement from the House of Commons, he was raised to the peerage as Baron Winmarleigh, of Winmarleigh in the County Palatine of Lancaster. However, he was seldom active in the House of Lords. He was made Constable of Lancaster Castle in 1879.

Family
In 1828 Wilson-Patten married Anna Maria Patten-Bold, daughter of his paternal uncle Peter Patten-Bold. They had six children, two sons and four daughters. However, Lord Winmarleigh survived both of his two sons, Captain John Wilson-Patten (d. 1873) and Arthur Wilson-Patten (1841-1866), as well as his grandson John Alfred Wilson-Patten (d. 1889), the only son of John. Consequently, on his death at the age of ninety in 1892 the barony became extinct.

Arms

References

External links
 

Winmarleigh, John Wilson-Patten, 1st Baron
Winmarleigh, John Wilson-Patten, 1st Baron
People educated at Eton College
Winmarleigh, John Wilson-Patten, 1st Baron
Conservative Party (UK) MPs for English constituencies
Winmarleigh, John Wilson-Patten, 1st Baron
Winmarleigh
UK MPs 1830–1831
UK MPs 1832–1835
UK MPs 1835–1837
UK MPs 1837–1841
UK MPs 1841–1847
UK MPs 1847–1852
UK MPs 1852–1857
UK MPs 1857–1859
UK MPs 1859–1865
UK MPs 1865–1868
UK MPs 1868–1874
UK MPs who were granted peerages
Chief Secretaries for Ireland
Tory members of the Parliament of the United Kingdom
Presidents of the Oxford Union
Members of the Parliament of the United Kingdom for Lancashire
Lancashire Militia officers
Peers of the United Kingdom created by Queen Victoria
Hulme Trust
Chancellors of the Duchy of Lancaster